Ihor Vasilyevich Tselovalnikov (2 January 1944 – 15 March 1986) was a Soviet cyclist. He competed at the 1968 and 1972 Summer Olympics in the 2000 m tandem sprint and finished in fifth and first place, respectively. Tselovalnykov represented the Burevestnik of the Ukrainian SSR.

Nationally he won four titles in the tandem sprint (1967, 1971–1974) and one in the 1000 m track time trial.

He graduated from the University of Kharkiv with a degree in economics (1969) and then from the Saint Petersburg Military Institute of Physical Education (1977). Between 1969 and 1972 he served in the Soviet Army, and after 1977 worked as a lecturer at the Kharkiv Military School of Missile Troops

References

External links
 

1944 births
1986 deaths
Soviet male cyclists
Olympic cyclists of the Soviet Union
Cyclists at the 1968 Summer Olympics
Cyclists at the 1972 Summer Olympics
Olympic gold medalists for the Soviet Union
Olympic medalists in cycling
Sportspeople from Yerevan
Burevestnik (sports society) athletes
National University of Kharkiv alumni
Medalists at the 1972 Summer Olympics
Armenian track cyclists
Ukrainian track cyclists